Boubacar Nimi is a Burkina Faso professional footballer, who plays as a forward for Étoile Filante de Ouagadougou and the Burkina Faso national football team.

International career
In January 2014, coach Brama Traore invited him to be a part of the Burkina Faso squad for the 2014 African Nations Championship. The team was eliminated in the group stages after losing to Uganda and Zimbabwe and drawing with Morocco.

References

Living people
Burkinabé footballers
2014 African Nations Championship players
Burkina Faso A' international footballers
1988 births
Association football forwards
21st-century Burkinabé people